The Italian Basketball Cup (Italian: Coppa Italiana di Pallacanestro), or Coppa Italia, is an annual professional basketball competition between pro clubs from the Italian Basketball League (LBA). It is Italy's first-tier cup competition, and is not to be confused with Italy's second-tier cup competition, the Italian Legadue Cup.

History and format
The first edition of the Italian Cup championship took place in 1968, and was won by Partenope Napoli. Between 1975 and 1983, the cup competition was not held, but it has been held regularly every year from 1984 onward. The formula of the competition has changed over the years. Beginning in 1990, after an elimination phase and subsequent knockout rounds, the tournament ends in a final four format. From 2000 onward, the ranked 8 teams compete for the trophy in a Final Eight format which consists of the quarter-finals, semifinals and the final over 3 days.

Finally, the winner of the Italian Cup championship then has the right to face the winner of the Italian League championship in a single final game to determine the winner the Italian Supercup championship.

Title holders 

 1967–68: Ignis Sud Napoli 
 1968–69: Ignis Varese
 1969–70: Ignis Varese 
 1970–71: Ignis Varese 
 1971–72: Simmenthal Milano 
 1972–73: Ignis Varese 
 1973–74: Norda Bologna 
 1974–83: Not Held
 1983–84: Granarolo Bologna 
 1984–85: Scavolini Pesaro 
 1985–86: Simac Milano 
 1986–87: Tracer Milano 
 1987–88: Snaidero Caserta 
 1988–89: Knorr Bologna 
 1989–90: Knorr Bologna 
 1990–91: Glaxo Verona 
 1991–92: Scavolini Pesaro 
 1992–93: Benetton Treviso 
 1993–94: Benetton Treviso 
 1994–95: Benetton Treviso 
 1995–96: Stefanel Milano 
 1996–97: Kinder Bologna 
 1997–98: Teamsystem Bologna 
 1998–99: Kinder Bologna 
 1999–00: Benetton Treviso 
 2000–01: Kinder Bologna 
 2001–02: Kinder Bologna 
 2002–03: Benetton Treviso 
 2003–04: Benetton Treviso 
 2004–05: Benetton Treviso 
 2005–06: Carpisa Napoli 
 2006–07: Benetton Treviso
 2007–08: A.IR. Avellino 
 2008–09: Montepaschi Siena 
 2009–10: Montepaschi Siena 
 2010–11: Montepaschi Siena
 2011–12: Montepaschi Siena (revoked)
 2012–13: Montepaschi Siena (revoked)
 2013–14: Banco di Sardegna Sassari 
 2014–15: Banco di Sardegna Sassari 
 2015–16: EA7 Emporio Armani Milano
 2016–17: EA7 Emporio Armani Milano
 2017–18: Fiat Torino
 2018–19: Vanoli Cremona
 2019–20: Umana Reyer Venezia
 2020–21: AX Armani Exchange Milano
 2021–22: AX Armani Exchange Milano
 2022–23: Pallacanestro Brescia

The finals

Source: LBA Final Eight

Performance by club

See also
Italian Basketball Federation
Italian Basketball League
Italian Basketball Supercup
Italian Basketball All Star Game
Serie A2 Basket
Italian LNP Cup

References

External links
 Italian League Site 

   
Cup
1967 establishments in Italy
Basketball cup competitions in Europe
Professional sports leagues in Italy